Oleg Andreyevich Anofriyev (sometimes spelled Anofriev, ; 20 July 193028 March 2018), PAR, was a Soviet and Russian theatre and film actor, voice actor, singer, songwriter, film director, and poet. He was born in Gelendzhik, but spent all his life in Moscow and graduated from Moscow Art Theatre in 1954. He was widely popular in USSR (mostly due to the leading role in The Bremen Town Musicians animated film) and was honored with the title Honored Artist of the RSFSR and later, People’s Artist of the Russian Federation.

Biography
Oleg Andreyevich Anofriyev was born in Gelendzhik on 20 July 1930 in the family of a doctor, head of medical furniture at the GPP-1, Andrei Sergeyevich Anofriyev and housewife Maria Gavrilovna Anofriyeva and was their third son, he had two older brothers, Sergei and Vladimir. Although the family lived in Moscow, Oleg was born in Gelendzhik, because during the summer holiday season, Andrei received an appointment every year as chief physician in a sanatorium on the Black Sea coast (when Oleg was born, he was the chief physician of the sanatorium of the Moscow State University).

Death
He died on 28 March 2018 in Moscow from severe heart disease.

Selected filmography

Actor 
 Behind Show Windows (За витриной универмага, 1955) as Slava Sidorkin
 A Girl with Guitar (Девушка с гитарой, 1958) as Vanya Savushkin
 A Simple Story (Простая история, 1960) as Agronomist
 Scarlet Sails (Алые паруса, 1961) as Letika the seaman
 Funny Stories (Весёлые истории, 1962) as Fedka
 Colleagues (Коллеги, 1962) as Vladka Karpov
Tale About the Lost Time (Сказка о потерянном времени, 1964) as old Petya
 Friends and Years (Друзья и годы, 1965) as Vadim Lyalin
 Passing Through Moscow (В Москве проездом…, 1970) as Alik
 Car, Violin and Blot the Dog (Автомобиль, скрипка и собака Клякса, 1974) as Accordion and electric guitar musician
 Incognito from St. Petersburg (Инкогнито из Петербурга, 1977) as Bobchinsky/Singing voice for Ivan Khlestakov
 The Turning Point (Поворот, 1978) as Vedeneyev's lawyer
 Be My Husband (Будьте моим мужем, 1981) as Spa visitor-veterinarian
 Along Unknown Paths (Там, на неведомых дорожках..., 1982) as Nightingale the Robber
 After the Rain, on Thursday (После дождичка в четверг, 1985) as King Avdey
 One Second for a Feat (Секунда на подвиг, 1985) as Gurenko
 Gardes-Marines, Ahead! (Гардемарины, вперёд!, 1987) as Nolken the Swedish ambassador
 A Man from the Boulevard des Capucines (Человек с бульвара Капуцинов, 1987) as Ballroom pianist
 The Criminal Quartet (Криминальный квартет, 1989) as Matvey Iosifovich Feldman
 Two Arrows. Stone Age Detective (Две стрелы. Детектив каменного века, 1989) as Drummer
 Back in the USSR (Назад в СССР, 1992) as Taxi driver
 Moscow Vacation (Московские каникулы, 1995) as Plane commander

Voice 
1964: The Satin Street (Sitsevaya ulitsa)
1969: The Bremen Town Musicians
1973: A Tale of a Priest and His Workman Balda
1974: A №10 Tram was coming; How a Lion-cub and a Tortoise Sang a Song; The Land of Sannikov
1975: In the Port
1979: Very Blue Beard

References

External links
 

Oleg Anofriyev at animator.ru

1930 births
2018 deaths
20th-century Russian male actors
20th-century Russian male singers
People from Gelendzhik
Moscow Art Theatre School alumni
Honored Artists of the RSFSR
People's Artists of Russia
Russian film directors
Russian male composers
Russian male film actors
Russian male poets
Russian male singers
Russian male stage actors
Russian male voice actors
Soviet film directors
Soviet male composers
Soviet male film actors
Soviet male poets
Soviet male singers
Soviet male stage actors
Soviet male voice actors
Deaths from heart disease